Tawuran (or tubir) is a form of customary mass street fighting between gangs of particular school related students in urban Indonesia, especially in the capital city Jakarta. It is practised largely by males in their junior or senior year of high school. 

Indonesian sociologist Wirumoto has suggested that it serves as a stress release mechanism, as it often occurs following examinations, holiday seasons or graduation. W. D. Mansur has suggested that it results not from personal factors such as religion or personality, but from group dynamics such as solidarity.

Tawuran can result in serious injuries or even death. In 1999 there were 67 deaths. The death toll kept rising. From year 2000's till late 2005's with result 297 deaths, in 2011 82 deaths. A 2013 Al Jazeera report noted the increasing use of acid attacks in tawuran, resulting in severe injury and disfigurement. According to one report, between 2012 and 2017, 130 students were killed.

See also 
 Crime in Indonesia

References

Further reading
Penyelesaian kasus tawuran pelajar di DKI Jakarta. Topo Santoso. Fakultas Hukum, Universitas Indonesia, 1998 

Culture of Jakarta
Youth in Indonesia
Murder in Indonesia
Street culture
Indonesian youth culture
Riots
Violence in Indonesia